Gösselsdorfer See is a lake of Carinthia, Austria.

The largely silted up lake is located between the municipalities of Eberndorf and Sittersdorf. It is characterised by extensive reed banks and adjacent wetlands. The waters are part of a larger protected landscape area.

Lakes of Carinthia (state)